English actor and filmmaker Gary Oldman made his film debut in the 1982 British ensemble drama Remembrance. He rose to prominence in British film with his portrayals of Sid Vicious in Sid and Nancy (1986), Joe Orton in Prick Up Your Ears (1987) and Rosencrantz in Rosencrantz & Guildenstern Are Dead (1990), while also gaining attention as the leader of a gang of football hooligans in the made-for-television drama film The Firm (1989). Regarded as a member of the "Brit Pack", he is also known for portraying a New York gangster in the American neo-noir crime film State of Grace (1990), Lee Harvey Oswald in JFK (1991) and Count Dracula in Bram Stoker's Dracula (1992).

Oldman is known for his portrayal of villains, like in the films True Romance with Christian Slater (1993), as Norman Stansfield in Léon: The Professional with Jean Reno (1994), The Fifth Element with Bruce Willis (1997), Air Force One with Harrison Ford (1997) and The Contender again with Christian Slater (2000). In 2004, he was cast as Sirius Black in Harry Potter and the Prisoner of Azkaban, the third film in the Harry Potter film series. He went on to reprise the role in Goblet of Fire,  Order of the Phoenix and a cameo in The Deathly Hallows – Part 2. He also played James Gordon in The Dark Knight Trilogy (2005–2012), George Smiley in Tinker Tailor Soldier Spy (2011) and Dreyfus in Dawn of the Planet of the Apes (2014). 

Oldman's portrayal of Winston Churchill in the 2017 war drama film Darkest Hour earned him an Academy Award for Best Actor, a Golden Globe Award for Best Actor in a Motion Picture Drama, and a Screen Actors Guild Award for Outstanding Performance by a Male Actor in a Leading Role. 

Oldman has executive produced films like The Contender, Plunkett & Macleane (1999) and Nil by Mouth (1997), the latter of which he also wrote and directed. He's been featured in television shows such as Fallen Angels (1993), Tracey Takes On... (1999) and Friends (2001). He has voiced the characters Ignitius and Viktor Reznov in the video games The Legend of Spyro and Call of Duty, respectively.

Film

Television

Video games

See also
 List of awards and nominations received by Gary Oldman

References

External links
 

Male actor filmographies
British filmographies
Filmography